Katara Towers,, and named as Crescent Tower Lusail and Katara Hospitality Tower, is a high rise tower in Lusail, Qatar. This luxury 5-star and 6-star hotel was opened in 2022 at the same time as the hosting of the World Cup in Qatar. The Katara Towers cover a total area of about 300,000 square meters. It will offer entertainment and recreational facilities, specialist boutiques, movie theatres and restaurants. Raffles Hotels & Resorts, Fairmont Hotels and Resorts and Accor are hosted in this building.

See also 
 Lusail
 Katara Hospitality

References

External links 
 Katara Towers at Emporis
 Lusail Katara Hotel North Tower at SkyscraperPage
 Katara Towers at Doka

Skyscrapers in Qatar
Lusail
Tourism in Qatar
Hotels in Qatar
Hotels established in 2022
2022 establishments in Qatar